Feder is the German word for "feather", "quill", and secondarily for "[mechanical] spring", and may refer to:

Surname 
Abraham Hyman Feder (1908-1997), American lighting designer
Adolphe Féder (1886–1943), Jewish-Ukrainian painter and illustrator
Dege Feder (born 1978), a multi-disciplinary Ethiopian-born artist based in Israel
Donald A. Feder (born 1946), American media consultant, free-lance writer and World Congress of Families Communications Director
Ed Feder (1896–1968),Australian rules footballer 
Essener Feder (or Feather), award for German-style board games
Eva Feder Kittay, American philosopher and academic
Galila Ron-Feder Amit (born 1949), Israeli children books author
Gottfried Feder (1883–1941), German economist and key member of the Thule Society and of the Nazi Party 
Janet Feder, American composer and guitarist
Gottfried Jens Feder (1939-2019), Norwegian physicist
Johann Georg Heinrich Feder (1740–1821), German philosopher 
Johann Michael Feder (1753–1824), German Roman Catholic theologian
Judy Feder, professor of Public Policy 
Kenneth Feder, professor of archaeology 
Naftali Feder (1920–2009), Israeli politician, member of the Knesset for the Alignment (1977-84)
Paula Marie Mathilde Illemann Feder (1893–1967), Danish actor and educator
Robert Feder (born 1956), media blogger 
Robert Arthur Feder (1909-1986), American screenwriter and film producer
Tobias Gutmann Feder (–1817), Maskilic writer, poet, and grammarian
Galila Ron-Feder Amit (born 1949), Israeli author

Others 
Feder (DJ), French DJ and music producer
Feder (fencing), an early modern practice or sparring weapon derived from the longsword
Feder Grotes, a "stressed" sans-serif type introduced by Jakob Erbar in 1910
Olami–Feder–Christensen model, an earthquake model conjectured to be an example of self-organized criticality

See also 
 Olami–Feder–Christensen model, an earthquake model
 Fader (disambiguation)